Chaetosaurus emeishanicola is a species of beetle in the family Carabidae, the only species in the genus Chaetosaurus.

References

Platyninae